2017 Wesson, provisional designation , is a stony asteroid from the inner regions of the asteroid belt, approximately 7 kilometers in diameter. It was discovered on 20 September 1903, by German astronomer Max Wolf at Heidelberg Observatory in southern Germany. It was later named after Mary Joan Wesson Bardwell, wife of Conrad Bardwell, an associate director of the Minor Planet Center.

Orbit and classification 

Wesson orbits the Sun in the inner main belt at a distance of 1.8–2.7 AU, orbiting once every 3 years and 5 months (1,235 days). Its orbit has an eccentricity of 0.19 and an inclination of 5° with respect to the ecliptic.

Physical characteristics 

Wesson has been characterized as a stony S-type asteroid. It has a rotation period of 3.418 hours. The numerous lightcurves have a brightness variation of 0.30 to 0.60 magnitude. According to the survey carried out by NASA's Wide-field Infrared Survey Explorer (WISE) with its subsequent NEOWISE mission, the asteroid measures 7.2 kilometers in diameter and its surface has an albedo of 0.200. The Collaborative Asteroid Lightcurve Link agrees with the results obtained by WISE.

Naming 

The asteroid was named after Mary Joan Wesson Bardwell, wife of Conrad M. Bardwell (1926–2010), after whom the minor planet 1615 Bardwell is named. He also established the identifications for this minor planet. The official  was published by the Minor Planet Center on 1 April 1978.

References

External links 
 Asteroid Lightcurve Database (LCDB), query form (info )
 Dictionary of Minor Planet Names, Google books
 Asteroids and comets rotation curves, CdR – Observatoire de Genève, Raoul Behrend
 Discovery Circumstances: Numbered Minor Planets (1)-(5000) – Minor Planet Center
 
 

 

002017
Discoveries by Max Wolf
Named minor planets
19030920